Cold Lake may refer to the following:

Canada
Cold Lake (Alberta), a lake in Alberta and Saskatchewan
Cold Lake, Alberta, a city
CFB Cold Lake, a Royal Canadian Air Force base in Alberta
Cold Lake oil sands, a deposit of oil sands located near Cold Lake, Alberta
Cold Lake First Nations, a First Nation in Alberta
Cold Lake Metis Settlement, Alberta

Other
Cold Lake (album), an album by Celtic Frost

See also
Cold Lakes (Nevada)